Yahiro is both a masculine Japanese given name and a Japanese surname.

Possible writings
Yahiro can be written using different combinations of kanji characters. Here are some examples:

弥弘, "more and more, vast"
弥広, "more and more, wide"
弥博, "more and more, doctor"
弥裕, "more and more, abundant"
弥浩, "more and more, vast"
弥洋, "more and more, ocean"
弥比呂, "more and more, compare, backbone"
弥宏, "more and more, wide"
彌弘, "more and more, vast"
彌廣, "more and more, wide"
八尋, "eight, inquire"
八弘, "eight, vast"
八洋, "eight, ocean"
八博, "eight,doctor"
野弘, "field, vast"
野大, "field, big"

The name can also be written in hiragana やひろ or katakana ヤヒロ.

Notable people with the given name Yahiro
, Japanese footballer and manager

Notable people with the surname Yahiro
, Japanese screenwriter
, Japanese guitarist

See also
Yahiro Station, a railway station in Sumida, Tokyo, Japan

Japanese-language surnames
Japanese masculine given names